Sannoth or Sanoth is a census town in North West district in the Indian state of Delhi.

Demographics
 India census, Sanoth had a population of 6075. Males constitute 60% of the population and females 40%. Sanoth has an average literacy rate of 72%, higher than the national average of 59.5%: male literacy is 79%, and female literacy is 66%. In Sanoth, 15% of the population is under 6 years of age. The village is near Narela city. 
Near Railway Station is Narela & Holambi Kalan of New Delhi-Chandigarh Railway Line.
Bus Root no. - 113,178, 708, 136, 701, 969, etc.
Sanoth village have 2 primary schools and 1 senior secondary school recognized by Delhi Government.
Sanoth village have 2 ATM.
1 Gym near main bus stand of Sanoth village organized by Dharmender Nirwal.It has a very good private school, Dhankaur Devi Convent School. The school is run by Mrs. Seema Rana, who is the daughter of Master Balbir Singh - a known educationist of Sanoth village.

References

Cities and towns in North West Delhi district